Bolqan-e Olya (also Romanized as Bolqān-e ‘Olyā; also known as Bolqān-e Bālā, Bolghān, Bolqān, and Yalqān-e Bālā) is a village in Golian Rural District, in the Central District of Shirvan County, North Khorasan Province, Iran. At the 2006 census, its population was 409, in 92 families.

References 

Populated places in Shirvan County